Robert Nicholas Williams (May 2, 1953 – January 25, 1979) was an American factory worker who was the first known human to be killed by a robot. While working at the Ford Motor Company's Michigan Casting Center, Williams was killed by an industrial robot arm on January 25, 1979.

Death and litigation

Williams was one of three operators of the parts retrieval system, a five-story robot built by the Unit Handling Systems division of Litton Industries. The robot was designed to retrieve castings from high density storage shelves at the Flat Rock plant. Part of the machine included one-ton transfer vehicles, which were carts on rubber wheels equipped with mechanical arms to move castings to and from the shelves. When the robot gave erroneous inventory readings, Williams was asked to climb into the racks to retrieve parts manually. Another news account states the robot was not retrieving parts quickly enough.

He climbed into the third level of the storage rack, where he was struck from behind and crushed by one of the one-ton transfer vehicles, killing him instantly. His body remained in the shelf for 30 minutes until it was discovered by workers who were concerned about his disappearance.

His family sued the manufacturers of the robot, Litton Industries, alleging "that Litton was negligent in designing, manufacturing and supplying the storage system and in failing to warn [system operators] of foreseeable dangers in working within the storage area." In a 1983 jury decision, the court awarded his estate $10 million and concluded that there simply were not enough safety measures in place to prevent such an accident from happening. He would go down in history as the first recorded human death by robot. The award was raised to $15 million in January 1984. Litton settled with the estate of Williams for an undisclosed amount in exchange for Litton not admitting negligence.

Litton had sought indemnification and recovery of judgment costs from Ford because Ford had not sent Williams to Litton-provided training and allowed Williams to enter the rack without engaging the lockout system. Since Litton had already settled with the estate of Williams, the Michigan Court of Appeals denied the action, and that decision was later upheld by the Supreme Court of Michigan.

See also
List of unusual deaths
Kenji Urada, (1943/1944–1981) a Japanese man killed by a robot in 1981

References

External links
 Kiska, Tim (August 11, 1983). "Robot firm liable in death". The Oregonian.
 Kiska, Tim (August 11, 1983). " Death on the job: Jury awards $10 million to heirs of man killed by robot at auto plant". Philadelphia Inquirer.
 "Death-by-robot yields award of $15 million". Philadelphia Inquirer. January 14, 1984.
 

1953 births
1979 deaths
Deaths caused by industrial robots
Accidental deaths in Michigan
Ford people